Joseph Hall (c. 1803 or c. 1806 – 10 February 1857) was Mayor of Adelaide from 1854 to 1855.

History
Joseph Hall migrated from England to South Australia around 1841. He was in business as a sharebroker with offices in the Waterhouse Chambers at the corner of Rundle and King William streets. He was elected Alderman for Robe Ward in October 1852, following the resignation of Peter Cumming, and elected mayor in 1854. He had a residence on Pennington Terrace, overlooking the Park Lands.

He died after a fall from a residence in Kermode Street, North Adelaide, while suffering the effects of delirium tremens. His family left for England around the same time. Apart from further details on the circumstances of his death, further information is hard to find.

See also
List of mayors and lord mayors of Adelaide

References

External links
 Trove List:-Joseph Hall

Mayors and Lord Mayors of Adelaide
1800s births
1857 deaths
English emigrants to colonial Australia
19th-century Australian politicians